Imalumab (BAX69) is an experimental monoclonal antibody against macrophage inhibitory factor (MIF), a cytokine known to exacerbate tumor growth. and as of January 2017 it is being tested in Phase IIa clinical trials for metastatic colorectal cancer. It was developed by Cytokine PharmaSciences and Baxalta, which was purchased by Shire Pharmaceuticals.

A phase I/II trial in patients with malignant ascites was terminated in 2016.

References 

Monoclonal antibodies for tumors
Experimental cancer drugs